Fisetinidol is a flavanol, a type of flavonoid.

External links
 Fisetinidol on metabolomics.jp

Flavanols
Catechols